SH3 domain-containing kinase-binding protein 1 (synonyms - CIN85, in rodents - Ruk) is an adaptor protein that in humans is encoded by the SH3KBP1 gene.

Function 

CBL (MIM 165360) constitutively interacts with SH3 domain-containing proteins and, upon tyrosine phosphorylation, with SH2 domain-containing proteins. The SH3KBP1 gene encodes an 85-kD CBL-interacting protein that enhances tumor necrosis factor (MIM 191160)-mediated apoptotic cell death (Narita et al., 2001).[supplied by OMIM]

Interactions 

SH3KBP1 has been shown to interact with B-cell linker, Grb2, SH3GLB2, SH3GL3, SH3GL2, BCAR1, Epidermal growth factor receptor, CBLB, Cbl gene, SOS1, CRK and PAK2.

References

Further reading